Tic Tac is a Swedish psychological thriller film and drama film which was released to cinemas in Sweden on 31 October 1997, directed by Daniel Alfredson and written by Hans Renhäll, about various people involved in small crime during one day and night in Stockholm. The film won the Guldbagge Award for best film and was Sweden's submission for the Academy Award for Best Foreign Language Film, but failed to be nominated.

Some critics have called the film "a Swedish Pulp Fiction".

Cast
Oliver Loftéen as Micke
Tuva Novotny as Jeanette
Jacob Nordenson as Kent
Tintin Anderzon as Ylva
Emil Forselius as Lasse
Mats Helin as Jorma
Claudio Salgado as Pedro
Nadja Weiss as Francesca
Thomas Hanzon as Niklas
Douglas Johansson as Tommy
Franco Mariano as Giuseppe
Michael Nyqvist as Vinni
Hugo Ruiz as Manuel
Gunvor Pontén as Rosita
Bengt Blomgren as Gösta
Barbro Kollberg as Edith
Ewamaria Björkström-Roos as Zoe
Gustaf Elander as Wikström
Camilla Hellquist as receptionist
Jesper Bergom-Larsson
Henry Duhs as Benny

Reception
Gunnar Rehlin of Variety called the film "A clever blend of the narrative styles of Short Cuts and Pulp Fiction, adding that "[it] is one of the most interesting films to come out of Sweden in a long time".

Awards and nominations
The film won the Guldbagge Awards for Best Film, Best Direction and Best Supporting Actor (Emil Forselius). Hans Renhäll was nominated for Best Screenplay. It also won the Don Quijote Award and FIPRESCI Prize at the Karlovy Vary International Film Festival.

See also
List of submissions to the 70th Academy Awards for Best Foreign Language Film
List of Swedish submissions for the Academy Award for Best Foreign Language Film

References

External links

Swedish thriller films
Films directed by Daniel Alfredson
Best Film Guldbagge Award winners
Films whose director won the Best Director Guldbagge Award
1990s Swedish films